Dorcadion gorbunovi is a species of beetle in the family Cerambycidae. It was described by Mikhail Leontievich Danilevsky in 1985. It is known from Armenia and Azerbaijan.

Subspecies
 Dorcadion gorbunovi gorbunovi Danilevsky, 1985
 Dorcadion gorbunovi rubenyani Lazarev, 2014

References

gorbunovi
Beetles described in 1985